The Eastgate Centre is a shopping centre and office block in central Harare, Zimbabwe, designed by Mick Pearce. Designed to be ventilated and cooled by entirely natural means, it was probably the first building in the world to use natural cooling to this level of sophistication. It opened in 1996 on Robert Mugabe Avenue and Second Street, and provides 5,600 m² of retail space, 26,000 m² of office space and parking for 450 cars.

Designing for thermal control 

The Eastgate Centre's design is a deliberate move away from the "big glass block". Glass office blocks are typically expensive to maintain at a comfortable temperature, needing substantial heating in the winter and cooling in the summer. They tend to recycle air, in an attempt to keep the expensively conditioned atmosphere inside, leading to high levels of air pollution in the building. Artificial air-conditioning systems are high-maintenance, and Zimbabwe has the additional problem that the original system and most spare parts have to be imported, squandering foreign exchange reserves.

Mick Pearce, the architect, therefore took an alternative approach. Because of its altitude, Harare has a temperate climate despite being in the tropics, and the typical daily temperature swing is 10 to 14 °C. This makes a mechanical or passive cooling system a viable alternative to artificial air-conditioning.

Passive cooling 

Passive cooling works by storing heat in the day and venting it at night as temperatures drop.

 Start of day: the building is cool.
 During day: machines and people generate heat, and the sun shines. Heat is absorbed by the fabric of the building, which has a high heat capacity, so that the temperature inside increases but not greatly.
 Evening: temperatures outside drop. The warm internal air is vented through chimneys, assisted by fans but also rising naturally because it is less dense, and drawing in denser cool air at the bottom of the building.
 Night: this process continues, cold air flowing through cavities in the floor slabs until the building's fabric has reached the ideal temperature to start the next day.

Passively cooled, Eastgate uses only 10% of the energy needed by a similar conventionally cooled building. When actively cooled, the Centre consumes 35% less energy to maintain the same temperature as a conventionally cooled building.

Eastgate is emulated by London's Portcullis House (2001), opposite the Palace of Westminster. The distinctive giant chimneys on which the system relies are clearly visible.

Modern use of traditional solutions 

To work well, the building must be very carefully designed. After computer simulation and analysis, the engineering firm Ove Arup, gave Pearce a set of rules.
They said that no direct sunlight must fall on the external walls at all and the north façade [direction of summer sun] window-to-wall area must not exceed 25%. They asked for a balance between artificial and external light to minimise energy consumption and heat gain. They said all windows must be sealed because of noise pollution and unpredictable wind pressures and temperatures, relying on ducted ventilation. Above all, windows must be light filters, controlling glare, noise and security.
To help with this last, the windows have adjustable blinds, but Pearce also used deep overhangs to keep direct sun off windows and walls. Deep eaves are a traditional solution in Africa, shading the walls completely from the high summer sun, while allowing the lower winter sun to warm the building in the morning.

Further, passive cooling systems are particularly appropriate for this part of Africa because, long before humans thought of it, passive cooling was being used by the local termites. Termite mounds include flues which vent through the top and sides, and the mound itself is designed to catch the breeze. As the wind blows, hot air from the main chambers below ground is drawn out of the structure, helped by termites opening or blocking tunnels to control air flow.

See also 

 Biomimetics
 Energy conservation
 Passive solar
 Solar chimney
 Architecture of Africa

Notes

Further reading 
 "Sustainable Architecture", The Architectural Review, UK, Sep 1996.
 Baird, George (2001). The Architectural Expression of Environmental Control Systems. Spon Press. 
 Gissen, David (2003). "Big and Green: Toward Sustainable Architecture in the 21st Century''. Princeton Architectural Press.

External links
  Retrieved 31 January 2006. Full text available to subscribers only.
 "Learning from Termites". AIArchitect. Retrieved 1 February 2006.
 ArchNet Digital Library Photographs and diagrams of the Eastgate Centre.

Buildings and structures completed in 1996
Shopping malls in Zimbabwe
Low-energy building
Shopping malls established in 1996
Buildings and structures in Harare
Tourist attractions in Harare